Molla Sheykh (also Romanized as Mollā Sheykh; also known as Sheykh) is a village in Baryaji Rural District, in the Central District of Sardasht County, West Azerbaijan Province, Iran. At the 2006 census, its population was 255, in 46 families.

References 

Populated places in Sardasht County